Directory may refer to:

 Directory (computing), or folder, a file system structure in which to store computer files
 Directory (OpenVMS command)
 Directory service, a software application for organizing information about a computer network's users and resources
 Directory (political), a system under which a country is ruled by a college of several people who jointly exercise the powers of a head of state or head of government
 French Directory, the government in revolutionary France from 1795 to 1799
 Business directory, a listing of information about suppliers and manufacturers
 Telephone directory, a book which allows telephone numbers to be found given the subscriber's name
 Web directory, an organized collection of links to websites

See also 
 Director (disambiguation)
 Directorate (disambiguation)